The 2021 Surrey County Council election took place alongside other English and Welsh local elections. Councillors were elected for all 81 single-member electoral divisions of Surrey County Council for a four-year term. The electoral system used was first-past-the-post voting.

The result was that Conservative councillors formed a significantly decreased majority on the council, losing a net 14 seats. Although they retained a very secure majority of 13 seats over and above all other Parties (47 seats to 34 seats), this was nevertheless the worst result for the Conservatives since 1993. The Liberal Democrats gained five seats overall, making them the largest party on the council after the Conservatives, but an informal alliance of Independent and Residents‘ Parties and councillors became the largest opposition group on the council with 16 councillors in total, a net increase of seven. The Labour Party and the Green Party of England and Wales both doubled their representation, going from one to two councillors each.

It has been suggested that there may have been formal and/or informal electoral pacts against the Conservatives in some areas of the county between Liberal Democrats, Labour, Greens and Residents’ Parties.

Results Summary

|-
|
| Independents and Residents Associations
| align="right" | 16
| align="right" | 7
| align="right" | 0
| align="right" | +7
| align="right" | 19.8
| align="right" | 14.6
| align="right" | 50,026
| align="right" | +20,580
|-

|}

Results by Division
Incumbent councillors are denoted by *

Elmbridge

Mike Bennison was previously elected as a Conservative.

Epsom and Ewell

Guildford

Mole Valley

Reigate and Banstead

Runnymede

Spelthorne

Surrey Heath

Tandridge

Waverley

Woking

By-elections

References 

Surrey County Council elections
2021 English local elections
2020s in Surrey